Roberto Gámez Pánchamé (born 23 October 1950) is a Honduran veterinarian and politician. He currently serves as deputy of the National Congress of Honduras representing the National Party of Honduras for Yoro.

References

1950 births
Living people
People from Yoro Department
Deputies of the National Congress of Honduras
National Party of Honduras politicians
Place of birth missing (living people)
Honduran veterinarians